Chitambo is a constituency of the National Assembly of Zambia. It covers Amoni Mukando, Cement Luanshika Kaliaba Shamboko, Kanchule Chisenga, Lasalo Mumba, Namilika Kawa, Musonda, Namutoya and Oka Kamwendo in Chitambo District of Central Province.

List of MPs

References

Constituencies of the National Assembly of Zambia
Constituencies established in 1968
1968 establishments in Zambia